The 12th Combat Aviation Brigade is a Combat Aviation Brigade of the United States Army. It was first organized as the 12th Aviation Group at Fort Benning, Georgia, on 18 June 1965.

Vietnam

The unit deployed to Vietnam in August 1965 to command non-organic Army aviation units, and by November 1965, the group consisted of 11,000 personnel and 34 aviation units. Between 1965 and 1966 the group doubled in size and was used to form the 1st Aviation Brigade in March 1966.

Among its units in Vietnam were the:
 11th Aviation Battalion 
 HQ at Phu Loi sometime between 1 May 1966 and 30 April 1970
 13th Aviation Battalion
 HQ at Can Tho sometime between 1 May 66 and 31 Jul 66
 145th Aviation Battalion 
 HQ at Bien Hoa sometime between 1 May 66 and 30 Apr 70
 210th Aviation Battalion 
 HQ at Long Thanh sometime between 15 January 1968 and 30 Apr 70
 214th Aviation Battalion 
 HQ at Bear Cat sometime between 1 Feb 67 and 30 Apr 68
 222nd Aviation Battalion 
 HQ at Vung Tau sometime between 1 May 66 and 30 Apr 68
 HQ at Bear Cat sometime between 1 Feb 70 and 30 Apr 70
 269th Aviation Battalion 
 HQ at Cu Chi sometime between January 1966 and 30 Apr 70
 308th Aviation Battalion 
 HQ at Bien Hoa sometime between 20 December 1967 and 31 Jan 68
 Buffalo Combat Aviation Battalion (Provisional) sometime between 15 Jan 67 and 31 Jan 67

Assigned to the Military Region III in Vietnam, the 12th Group was the largest unit of its type to serve in combat. Its colors, emblazoned with 18 campaign streamers, give lasting testimony to its role. The unit earned the Meritorious Unit Commendation, two Vietnamese Crosses for Gallantry with Palm, and the Vietnamese Civic Action Medal, First Class while in Vietnam.

Cold War 

Upon its return in March 1973, the 12th Aviation Group became a major subordinate command of the XVIII Airborne Corps, Fort Bragg, North Carolina. In November 1979, the 12th Aviation Group deployed to Lindsey Air Station, Wiesbaden, Germany as a major subordinate command of the V Corps, providing command and control of aviation units throughout the V Corps area of operation. In April 1984, Headquarters Company, 12th Aviation Group moved to Wiesbaden Air Base. In October 1987, under army-wide restructuring, the 12th Aviation Group was re-designated as the 12th Aviation Brigade, along with its subordinate units: 5th Battalion, 158th Aviation Regiment; C Company, 7th Battalion, 158th Aviation Regiment; and B Company, 6th Battalion, 158th Aviation Regiment. In the latter part of 1988, the Brigade re-structured again when the 5th Squadron (AH 64), 6th Cavalry Regiment arrived in Europe.

 During the Cold War years the 12th had a 12-man pathfinder platoon assigned to the group headquarters. The authorization for the pathfinder unit was deleted around the time the group was redesignated a brigade and the pathfinders departed as their tours ended. Their beret flash and parachute wing trimming can be seen on the Institute of Heraldry website.

Middle East 

In August 1990, the Brigade deployed to Southwest Asia for Operations Desert Shield and Desert Storm with 2–3 Aviation Regiment (Attack) attached. During Desert Storm the Brigade provided a highly mobile and lethal maneuver force to the multi-national forces in Saudi Arabia. Initially attached to the 101st Airborne Division (Air Assault), the Brigade became a major subordinate command of XVIII Airborne Corps in January 1991. During the four-day coalition ground offensive, the Brigade flew nearly 400 flight hours, transporting 390 tons of cargo to forward deployed units and providing essential combat and combat support services for the ground offensive.

Post-Cold War 

On 15 June 1992, the 5th Squadron, 6th Cavalry Regiment was de-activated as part of the downsizing of U.S. Army Europe (USAREUR). The 3rd Battalion, 58th Aviation Regiment (Air Traffic Services) joined the Brigade on 16 June 1992.

Since the end of the Cold War, the Brigade has played a major role in America's peacekeeping operations. From 1991 until 1996, 12th Brigade ensured the safety of Kurdish citizens during Operation Provide Comfort. The Brigade operated the Beirut Air Bridge from 1993 until 1998, providing a logistical lifeline to the US Embassy in Beirut from Cyprus. The Brigade also deployed soldiers to Hungary and Bosnia in 1995 to enforce the peace during Operations Joint Endeavor and Joint Guard.

In April 1999, the Brigade deployed to Tirana, Albania as part of Task Force Hawk in support of NATO Operation Allied Force. The Brigade Task Force consisted of 65 aircraft including UH-60 Black Hawks, CH-47 Chinooks, AH-64 Apaches, and UH-60 MEDEVAC aircraft. When peace was declared in June 1999, the Brigade transported elements of the 82nd Airborne Division into Macedonia and Kosovo, moving 390 personnel, 24 vehicles, and 13 pallets of equipment in less than 48 hours of the signing of the Military Technical Agreement. The Brigade flew in excess of 6,000 hours and conducted 22,185 aircraft movements in support of operations in Albania, Macedonia, and Kosovo, with CH-47 and Air Traffic Control elements supporting Task Force Falcon until March 2001 and June 2000, respectively. After returning from Task Force Hawk and Task Force Falcon, 12th Brigade prepared for re-structuring and re-stationing initiatives. USAREUR Movement Directive 5-00 directed all of the Aviation Brigade elements stationed at Wiesbaden Army Airfield to move to Giebelstadt Army Airfield. On 30 June 2000, 5th Battalion, 158th Aviation Regiment, the largest aviation battalion in theater consisting of 840 soldiers, split into two separate battalions, 3-158 Aviation Regiment and 5-158 Aviation Regiment. On 31 August 2000, all units from Wiesbaden closed on Giebelstadt Army Airfield.

War on Terror 

In support of the Global War on Terror, the 12th Aviation Brigade conducted full spectrum combat operations during its year-long deployment to Operation Iraqi Freedom. The brigade flew thousands of hours, moved over 25,000 personnel, and controlled over 230,000 air movements. In February 2005 the 12th Aviation Brigade deployed to Afghanistan in support Operation Enduring Freedom and to Pakistan in support of International Earthquake Humanitarian Relief Operations. While in support of Operation Enduring Freedom Task Force Griffin flew in excess of 52,000 hours, transported 105,000 personnel, and moved over 25 million pounds of cargo. On 7 August 2006, the units of Aviation Brigade, 1st Infantry Division combined with units of both the 12th Aviation Brigade and the former 11th Aviation Group (inactivated 9 June 2005) and reflagged as the 12th Aviation Brigade (Combat), attached to the 1st Armored Division. On 20 March 2007 the 12th became a separate brigade under V Corps. Most recently, the 12th deployed to Iraq in the summer of 2007, organized as Task Force XII in support of Operation Iraqi Freedom. TF XII served in Balad, Iraq as the Corps Aviation Brigade under Multi-National Corps-Iraq over a four-month period before relocating to Taji as the aviation brigade under Multi-National Division-Baghdad. 12 CAB’s 3rd Battalion deployed to Balad and Basarah, Iraq from July 2008 to August 2009 being the last unit in the Army to serve longer than 12 months in Combat. 

In May 2012, the CAB deployed five of its seven battalions to Afghanistan, while at the same time sending one attack battalion, 3-159th ARB, to Kuwait to support Operation Spartan Shield in the Persian Gulf. Only 1-214th remained in Germany. The aviation battalions were organized into similarly equipped task forces, each capable of providing the same mission and support to units operating in RC East, RC West and RC North. 3-58 AOB, known as TF Guardian, deployed to manage the airfield at Tarin Kowt in RC South. While the brigade headquarters redeployed in September as part of the drawdown of surge forces, the battalion task forces Storm, Gunslinger, Guardian, Ready and Pirate remained in Afghanistan providing direct support to units across the country. Task Force Pirate, 1/211 ARB from the Utah Army National Guard joined the Griffin Brigade for this deployment, providing seamless integration with their active duty counterparts in RC North and RC West. At the height of the deployment, 12th CAB had Soldiers and helicopter crews operating from more than 30 different locations.

Montenegro
In February 2012, a sudden winter storm struck Montenegro, leaving hundreds of people stranded in the mountains of the Eastern European country. While the bulk of the Brigade was preparing for an upcoming deployment, 1-214th GSAB sent two UH-60 Blackhawk helicopters, with pilots, aircrews and medical personnel to respond. The deployed team was under the command of COL Robert Levalley of the 361st Civil Affairs unit (Army Reserve), based in Kaiserslautern, Germany. While there, the crews worked with Montenegrin pilots and civilians and combined efforts with helicopters from Croatia, Slovenia and Greece to deliver food and livestock feed, as well as to transport injured civilians to medical facilities there.

Current Role 

The brigade is currently based around Ansbach, Bavaria, in Germany, and headquartered in Katterbach Kaserne, with subordinate units at Katterbach Army Airfield, Grafenwoehr Army Airfield, and Wiesbaden Army Airfield.

In March 2013, for the first time since 2007, the entire 12th CAB returned to Germany, where they continue to train and operate in support of EUCOM and AFRICOM contingency missions. The 12th CAB is currently reorganizing.

The 12th Combat Aviation Brigade currently consists of the following units:
 Headquarters and Headquarters Company (HHC)-Katterbach Army Airfield
  1st Battalion, 3rd Aviation Regiment (Attack Reconnaissance) 
HHC/1-3rd Attack Reconnaissance Battalion "Cobras"-Katterbach Army Airfield
A/1-3rd Attack Reconnaissance Battalion "Assassins" (AH-64D)-Katterbach Army Airfield
B/1-3rd Attack Reconnaissance Battalion "Warlords" (AH-64D)-Katterbach Army Airfield
C/1-3rd Attack Reconnaissance Battalion "Outcasts" (AH-64D)-Katterbach Army Airfield
D/1-3rd Attack Reconnaissance Battalion "Death Dealers" (ASC)-Katterbach Army Airfield
E/1-3rd Attack Reconnaissance Battalion "Bulldogs" (FSC)-Katterbach Army Airfield
  1st Battalion, 214th Aviation Regiment (General Support/VIP Fixed Wing)
HHC/1-214th General Support Aviation Battalion "Dogfighters"-Wiesbaden Army Airfield
A/1-214th General Support Aviation Battalion  "Aces" (UH-60M)-Wiesbaden Army Airfield
B/1-214th General Support Aviation Battalion "Big Windy" (CH-47F)-Katterbach Army Airfield
C/1-214th General Support Aviation Battalion "Dust Off" (HH-60M)-Grafenwoehr Army Airfield
D/1-214th General Support Aviation Battalion "Skymasters" (ASC)-Wiesbaden Army Airfield
D/1-214th General Support Aviation Battalion "Dead Rabbits" detachment- Katterbach Army Airfield.
E/1-214th General Support Aviation Battalion "Barons" (C-12, UC-35)-Wiesbaden Army Airfield

An article in the Stars & Stripes on 1 March 2013 stated 1-214th Aviation would be reduced at Clay Kaserne, Wiesbaden, by 190 soldier spaces and at Landstuhl Regional Medical Center by 50 soldier spaces in 2016. Additionally, 3-158th Aviation would return to CONUS in 2015.

References

External links 

 Official homepage of the 12th Combat Aviation Brigade

Military units and formations established in 1965
012
Ansbach